Alan Michael Blow  (born 3 December 1949) is an Australian judge who is the current Chief Justice of Tasmania.

After graduating from the University of Sydney with Bachelor of Arts and Bachelor of Laws degrees, he practised as a barrister in civil litigation, criminal and family law, before being appointed as a judge of the Supreme Court of Tasmania in 2000. He has also a long time lecturer in Supreme Court Advocacy at the University of Tasmania's Centre for Legal Studies, teaching postgraduate legal practice students.

In 2009, Blow presided over the trial of Susan Neill-Fraser for the murder of Bob Chappell. He sentenced Neill-Fraser to 26 years’ imprisonment. The sentence was later reduced to 23 years’ imprisonment.

On 8 April 2013, Blow was appointed Chief Justice of Tasmania, replacing Ewan Crawford who had reached the mandatory retirement age of 72.

In 2018 Blow was appointed Officer of the Order of Australia for "distinguished service to the judiciary and to the law, particularly as Chief Justice of the Supreme Court of Tasmania, to legal education and professional standards, and to the community".

In Dec 2021, Blow would have reached compulsory retirement age of 72 for a Tasmanian Supreme Court Justice. However Tasmanian Parliament had extended the compulsory retirement age to 75 at Blow's request.

References

 

1949 births
Living people
Chief Justices of Tasmania
Judges of the Supreme Court of Tasmania
21st-century Australian judges
Officers of the Order of Australia
Recipients of the Medal of the Order of Australia
Commanders of the Order of St John
Australian King's Counsel
Australian barristers
Sydney Law School alumni
University of Sydney alumni